is a Japanese figure skater. He finished sixth at the 2012 Winter Youth Olympics in Innsbruck, Austria, after placing tenth in the short program and third in the free skate. He won the bronze medal at the 2014–15 Japan Junior Championships and finished 12th at the 2016 World Junior Championships in Debrecen, Hungary. In February 2017, he won his first senior international medal, bronze at the Bavarian Open.

Programs

Competitive highlights 
GP: Grand Prix; CS: Challenger Series; JGP: Junior Grand Prix

References

External links 
 

1996 births
Japanese male single skaters
Kansai University alumni
Living people
People from Kushiro, Hokkaido
Figure skaters at the 2012 Winter Youth Olympics
Competitors at the 2019 Winter Universiade
20th-century Japanese people
21st-century Japanese people